The Health Protection Agency (HPA) was a non-departmental public body in the United Kingdom. It was an organisation that was set up by the UK government in 2003 to protect the public from threats to their health from infectious diseases and environmental hazards.

The HPA's role was to provide an integrated approach to protecting public health in the UK.  It did this by providing advice and information to the general public, health professionals, and local government and by providing emergency services, support and advice to the National Health Service (NHS) and the Department of Health. The HPA also had a lead role in helping preparations for new and emerging health threats, such as a bioterrorism or in the event of an emerging virulent disease strain.

There were four HPA centres – at Porton Down in Salisbury, Chilton in Didcot, South Mimms in Hertfordshire, and Colindale in NW London. In addition, the HPA had regional laboratories across England and administrative headquarters in Central London. On April 1, 2013, the HPA minus the South Mimms site became part of Public Health England, a new executive agency of the Department of Health (DoH). The National Institute for Biological Standards and Control (NIBSC) located in South Mimms was merged with the Medicines and Healthcare products Regulatory Agency (MHRA).

History
The Health Protection Agency (HPA), originally established as an NHS special health authority in 2003. On 1 April 2005, the Agency became a non-departmental public body, with the National Radiological Protection Board (NRPB) being merged into the organisation at the same time.

The origins of the HPA's largest facility in Porton Down can be traced back to 1940, when Porton had a highly secret and independent 'Biology Department' under the Ministry of Defence to study biological warfare and defence against it. It was called the 'Microbiological Research Department' (by 1946), and subsequently the 'Microbiological Research Establishment' (from 1951) with research becoming increasingly defensive and civilian in nature. Total civilian control was established by moving biological defence work to the Chemical Defence Establishment (now [dstl]), and renaming the facility from 1 April 1979 as the Centre for Applied Microbiology and Research (CAMR) within the Public Health Laboratory Service (PHLS). In April 1994, CAMR moved from PHLS centre to the Microbiological Research Authority (MRA), reporting to the Department of Health and still continuing the programme in civil microbiological research started in 1979.

Microbiology Services is still the biggest of the four Divisions within the HPA with 1800 staff, consisting of laboratory groups from the Centre for Emergency Preparedness and Response, the Centre for Infections, the eight regional microbiology laboratories and 37 collaborating hospital laboratories. Together, these laboratories provide frontline diagnostic and public health microbiology services to NHS trusts and HPA health protection units. Its remit includes infectious disease surveillance, providing specialist and reference microbiology and microbial epidemiology, coordinating the investigation and cause of national and uncommon outbreaks, helping advise government on the risks posed by various infections and responding to international health alerts. In addition, both basic and applied research is undertaken into understanding infectious diseases and the group manufactures a number of healthcare products, including vaccines and therapeutics. For instance, the HPA is the sole licensed manufacturer of the anthrax vaccine in the UK.

Funding
HPA is accountable to the UK Secretary of State for Health, and is funded primarily by Government Grant in Aid.  Other income is received from the NHS, commercial activities, grants, and other sources.  HPA’s income for the fiscal year ending 31 March 2008, was £160.2 million from Revenue Government financing plus £109.2 million total operating income. Total average staff numbers for that year, including secondments and agency staff, were 3,394 staff.

Following consultation during April 2010, the HPA has been organised into four groups, with further consultation going on as to the exact structure and function, and the proposed merger into Public Health England in April 2013. These four groups are: Microbiology Services, Health Protection Services, Biological Standards and Control, and the Centre for Radiation, Chemical and Environmental Hazards.

Microbiology Services
The Division will include the laboratory groups from the Centre for Infections; Centre for Emergency Preparedness and Response; the Regional Microbiology Network and their associated supports. The current remit of the Centre includes infectious disease surveillance, providing specialist and reference microbiology and microbial epidemiology, coordinating the investigation and cause of national and uncommon outbreaks, helping advise government on the risks posed by various infections and responding to international health alerts. 
 
The Centre for Emergency Preparedness and Response prepares for and coordinates responses to potential healthcare emergencies, including possible acts of deliberate release.  In addition, both basic and applied research is undertaken into understanding infectious diseases and the Centre manufactures a number of healthcare products, including vaccines and therapeutics. Internationally recognised as a world leader in microbiology research and testing, HPA's Porton Down Centre (formerly the Centre for Applied Microbiology & Research, and prior to that the Ministry of Defence's Microbiological Research Establishment) works with foreign governments, international biotechnology and pharmaceutical corporations, and start-up and spin-out companies.  The strategic goal of the Centre is "to build on and develop the intellectual assets of the organisation in partnership with industry."  Areas of expertise include:  bacterial vaccines, toxin therapeutics, Good Laboratory Practice (GLP) and in-vivo testing of compounds, biodefence and biosafety testing, diagnostics, and the provision of cell cultures.
 
The current Regional Microbiology Network is composed of eight regional microbiology laboratories. In addition, 37 hospital microbiology laboratories participate as HPA collaborating laboratories. Together, these laboratories provide frontline diagnostic and public health microbiology services to NHS trusts and HPA health protection units.

Health Protection Services
This Division will comprise two nationally organised services each with their own head: LaRS and a new National Epidemiology Service. Combining these services into one grouping will facilitate and reinforce close team working among those with the skills relevant to delivering effective and consistent responses to significant health protection threats. LaRS currently provides support to the front line response by coordinating services at the regional and local level. It is a source of specialist advice and operational support and by contributing actively to policy making and implementation in partnership with other HPA divisions and externally with the National Health Service (NHS), local authorities and other agencies.

Centre for Radiation, Chemical and Environmental Hazards (CRCE)
The HPA Centre for Radiation, Chemical and Environmental Hazards comprises the  Radiation Protection Division (formerly the National Radiological Protection Board) and the Chemical Hazards and Poisons Division. The base for the Centre is in Chilton, Oxfordshire.

Biological Standards and Control (NIBSC)
The NIBSC mission is to assure the quality of biological medicines. At the heart of the work is the preparation, storage and worldwide distribution of World Health Organization international standards and reference materials to provide benchmarks for product quality. In addition NIBSC provides testing services as the UK's Official Medicines Control Laboratory to ensure compliance with product specifications. These activities and advice provided by NIBSC are underpinned by leading edge scientific research covering a wide range of scientific disciplines. In April 2013, the NIBSC left the HPA and was merged with the UK’s Medicines and Healthcare products Regulatory Agency (MHRA).

Health Protection Agency Annual Conference
The Health Protection Agency Annual Conference, which is attended by approximately one thousand health professionals and scientists to promote scientific excellence and best practice in health protection and emergency planning, brings together experts from a wide variety of disciplines to share knowledge of the latest scientific research and developments. From 2013 the name of these conferences changes to "Public Health England Annual Conference".

See also 

 Similar Agencies
 European Centre for Disease Prevention and Control (ECDC) 
 Centers for Disease Control and Prevention (CDC) 
 Centre for Health Protection (CHP) 
 Institut de veille sanitaire (IVS) 
 Public Health Agency of Canada (PHAC) 
 National Centre for Disease Control
 Public health

References

External links
 Official website
 Health Protection Agency Annual Conference 2012
 Health Protection Agency Annual Conference (till 2012; link defunct)
 Public Health England Annual Conference
 Pharmaceutical-Technology.com - "Health Protection Agency - Healthcare Product Research, Development and GMP Manufacture:  The Health Protection Agency has been working with the pharmaceutical industry for over 50 years, undertaking contract research, development and manufacture of healthcare products"

2003 establishments in England
Public health in the United Kingdom
Department of Health and Social Care
Defunct public bodies of the United Kingdom
National Health Service (England)
Government agencies established in 2003